Aikaranad North  is a village in Ernakulam district in the Indian state of Kerala.

Demographics
 India census, Aikaranad North had a population of 18,940; 9413 males and 9527 females.

References

Villages in Ernakulam district